Wickliffe may refer to:

People
Charles A. Wickliffe (1788—1869), a U.S. Representative from Kentucky
Dean Wickliffe, a New Zealander convicted of murder
John Wickliffe or John Wycliffe (c. 1320–1384), English philosopher, theologian, preacher, translator, reformer and teacher 
Letty M. Wickliffe (1902-2001), African-American educator
Robert C. Wickliffe, (1819—1895), Lieutenant Governor and Governor of Louisiana 
Robert Charles Wickliffe, (1874–1912, grandson of Charles A. Wickliffe and cousin of John Crepps Wickliffe Beckham), a U.S. Representative from Louisiana

Places
in Australia
 Wickliffe, Victoria

in the United States
 Wickliffe, Indiana
 Wickliffe, Kentucky
 Wickliffe (New Roads, Louisiana), listed on the National Register of Historic Places in Pointe Coupee Parish, Louisiana
 Wickliffe, Ohio
 Wickliffe, Oklahoma
 Wickliffe, Virginia

See also
Wycliffe (disambiguation)